Sulforaphane (sometimes sulphoraphane in British English) is a compound within the isothiocyanate group of organosulfur compounds. It is produced when the enzyme myrosinase transforms glucoraphanin, a glucosinolate, into sulforaphane upon damage to the plant (such as from chewing or chopping during food preparation), which allows the two compounds to mix and react.

Sulforaphane is present in cruciferous vegetables, such as broccoli, Brussels sprouts, and cabbage.

Occurrence and isolation
Sulforaphane occurs in broccoli sprouts, which, among cruciferous vegetables, have the highest concentration of glucoraphanin, the precursor to sulforaphane.  It is also found in cabbage, cauliflower, Brussels sprouts, bok choy, kale, collards, mustard greens, and watercress.

Research
Although there has been some basic research on how sulforaphane might have effects in vivo, there is no clinical evidence that consuming cruciferous vegetables and sulforaphane affects the risk of cancer or any other disease, as of 2017.

See also
 Raphanin

References

Experimental cancer drugs
Isothiocyanates
Sulfoxides
 
1,4-Butanediyl compounds